Sacerdos Cereris,  sacerdos Cerealis or sacerdos Cereris publica was the title of the Priestess of the goddess  Ceres in Ancient Rome. It was one of two Roman state cults to include female priests (the other being the Vestals). 

The worship of Demeter and Persephone were introduced in Rome as the worship of Ceres and Proserpina, as well as the Roman versions of Thesmophoria (sacrum anniversarium) and Eleusinian Mysteries (initia Ceres), where Roman wives and daughters sacrificed a sow and enacted the drama between the goddess and her daughter.  

This cult was supervised by the priestesses of Ceres. As the cult was originally Greek, the priestesses, at least initially, were selected among Greek women from Naples and Elea.  They had a high position in Roman society, where they were the only priestesses aside from the Vestals who were active within a publicly funded state cult.

See also
 High Priestess of Demeter
 Priestess of Hera at Argos

References 

 Meghan J. DiLuzio:  A Place at the Altar: Priestesses in Republican Rome, 2020

Priestesses of the Roman Empire
Ancient Roman religious titles
Priestesses of the Roman Republic
Ancient Roman priestesses